Sergeant Schwenke (German: Oberwachtmeister Schwenke) is a 1935 German drama film directed by Carl Froelich and starring Gustav Fröhlich, Marianne Hoppe and Karl Dannemann. It was made at the former National Studios in Berlin's Tempelhof area which were now controlled by Froelich. The film's sets were designed by the art directors  Franz Schroedter and Walter Haag. It is based on a novel of the same title by Hans Joachim Freiherr von Reizenstein. It was remade in 1955 as Sergeant Borck..

Cast
 Gustav Fröhlich as Oberwachtmeister Willi Schwenke 
 Marianne Hoppe as Maria Schönborn, Verkäuferin im Blumenhaus Floris 
 Karl Dannemann as Oberwachtmeister Wölfert 
 Katja Bennefeld as Frau Wölfert, Marias Schwester
 Walter Steinbeck as Baankier Wenkstern 
 Emmy Göring as Rena, seine Frau
 Falk May as Hans-Helmut, ihr Sohn 
 Ruth Nitsche as Sybille, ihre Tochter
 Sybille Schmitz as Erna Zuwade, Stütze bei Wenkstern
 Ellen Geyer as Emma, Köchin bei Wenkstern 
 Herbert Gernot as Fritsch, Chauffeur bei Wenkstern
 Claire Fuchs-Kaufmann as Fanny Mehlmann, Wirtin von 'Fannys gute Stube'
 Valy Arnheim
 Rudolf Biebrach
 Gerhard Bienert
 Anna Dammann
 Bruno Fritz as Ein Stammgast 
 Hugo Froelich as Ein Kellner
 Knut Hartwig as Obermeister 
 Willy Kaufman
 Maria Krahn
 Anna Müller-Lincke
 Hans Paschen
 Harald Paulsen as Karl Franke 
 Oscar Sabo as Radmann 
 Georg H. Schnell
 Werner Schott
 Leo Sloma

References

Bibliography 
 Goble, Alan. The Complete Index to Literary Sources in Film. Walter de Gruyter, 1999.
 Klaus, Ulrich J. Deutsche Tonfilme: Jahrgang 1935. Klaus-Archiv, 1988.

External links 
 

1935 films
Films of Nazi Germany
German crime drama films
1935 crime drama films
1930s German-language films
Films directed by Carl Froelich
Police detective films
Tobis Film films
German black-and-white films
1930s German films